Li Yu may refer to:

 Emperor Suzong of Tang (711–762), personal name Li Yu, emperor of the Tang dynasty
 Emperor Daizong of Tang (727–779), personal name Li Yu, emperor of the Tang dynasty, Emperor Suzong's son
 Li Yu, Prince of Dan (died 820), Emperor Daizong of Tang's son
 Li Yu, Prince of De (died 905), Emperor Zhaozong of Tang's son, briefly a puppet emperor
 Li Yu (Later Tang) (died 935), chief councilor of the Later Tang dynasty
 Li Yu (Southern Tang) (937–978), ruler of the Southern Tang dynasty, also a famous poet
 Li Yu (author) (1610–1680), Chinese author during the Ming and Qing dynasties 
 Li Yu (speed skater) (born 1961), Chinese short track speed skater
 Li Yu (director) (born 1973), Chinese film director and screenwriter

See also
 Liyu (disambiguation)
 Li You (disambiguation) — "Li You" is the pinyin equivalent of "Li Yu" in Wade–Giles